Imdaad Hamid (5 July 1944 – 3 August 2022) was an Indonesian politician. He served as mayor of Balikpapan from 2001 to 2011.

Imdaad died in Jakarta on 3 August 2022, at the age of 78.

References

1944 births
2022 deaths
People from Kutai Kartanegara Regency
Dayak people
Mayors and regents of places in East Kalimantan
Mulawarman University alumni